The eighty-third Cabinet of Bulgaria was a caretaker technocratic government set up by President Petar Stoyanov following the resignation of the Videnov government. The government, headed by Prime Minister Stefan Sofiyanski, ruled from February 12, 1997 to May 21, 1997, when the new cabinet took office.

See also  
 History of Bulgaria since 1989

Bulgarian governments
1997 establishments in Bulgaria